Empire of Dirt is a 2013 Canadian drama film directed by Peter Stebbings. It was screened in the Contemporary World Cinema section at the 2013 Toronto International Film Festival.

The film was a shortlisted nominee for Best Picture at the 2nd Canadian Screen Awards. It also garnered nominations for Best Actress (Cara Gee), Best Supporting Actress (Jennifer Podemski), Best Original Screenplay (Shannon Masters) and Best Editing (Jorge Weisz).

Plot
The film stars Cara Gee as Lena, a young single First Nations mother struggling to bridge the generation gap with her daughter Peeka (Shay Eyre) and her mother Minerva (Jennifer Podemski).

Production
The film was shot from 19 September to 4 October 2012 at Kensington Market in Toronto and at Keswick, Ontario. Its original working title was Empire of Dirt, and it was briefly called Running Wolf.

Cast

References

External links
 
 Empire of Dirt at Mongrel Media
 Empire of Dirt on Highball.TV

2013 films
2013 drama films
Canadian drama films
English-language Canadian films
First Nations films
Canadian Film Centre films
2010s English-language films
2010s Canadian films